The 2017 J1 League (known as the 2017 Meiji Yasuda J1 League (2017 明治安田生命J1リーグ) for sponsorship reasons) was the 25th season of the J1 League, the top Japanese professional league for association football clubs, since its establishment in 1993. The season began on 25 February 2017 and ended on 2 December. Fixtures for the 2017 season were announced on 26 January 2017.

Kashima Antlers were the defending champions. Consadole Sapporo, Shimizu S-Pulse and Cerezo Osaka entered as the three promoted teams from the 2016 J2 League.

The league was won by Kawasaki Frontale, winning their first major title while in J1, and 40 years after their first season in the Japanese top division.

Clubs

A total of 18 clubs will contest the league, including 15 sides from the 2016 season and three promoted from the 2016 J2 League. This will include the two top teams; Consadole Sapporo and Shimizu S-Pulse from the J2 League, and the winners of the play-offs; Cerezo Osaka.

The three promoted clubs replace Nagoya Grampus, Shonan Bellmare and Avispa Fukuoka. Former J1 League champion Nagoya Grampus were relegated to the J2 League for the first time in their history.

Stadiums and locations

Personnel and kits

Managerial changes

Foreign players
The total number of foreign players is restricted to five per club. For matchday squad registration, a club can register up to four foreign players, but a maximum of three can be from outside the AFC. Players from J.League partner nations (Thailand, Vietnam, Myanmar, Cambodia, Singapore, Indonesia, Iran, Malaysia, and Qatar) are exempt from these club registration and matchday squad registration restrictions.

Players name in bold indicates the player is registered during the summer transfer window.

Results

League table

Positions by round

Results table

Season statistics

Top scorers
As of matches played on December 2nd, 2017.

Top assists
As of matches played on December 2nd, 2017.

Hat-tricks

Note
(H) – Home ; (A) – Away

Attendances

References

J1 League seasons
1
Japan